John Carroll Dye (January 31, 1963 – January 10, 2011) was an American film and television actor known for his role as Andrew in the spiritual television drama series Touched by an Angel.

Early life
Dye was born in Amory, Mississippi, one of four sons of Jim and Lynn Dye, a furniture manufacturer and homemaker, respectively, who raised their sons in the Methodist denomination. The family moved to Cleveland, Tennessee, where he attended Cleveland High School, and later to Tupelo, Mississippi. He was introduced to acting by playing the role of Friedrich, the eldest male von Trapp child in a school production of The Sound of Music at Cleveland High School. He graduated from Tupelo High School, where he again played Friedrich von Trapp. Dye found himself bitten by the acting bug. After graduating, he enrolled at Mississippi State University in hopes of becoming a civil rights lawyer. After a year at Mississippi State University, he decided to become an actor, and was advised against it by his great-grandmother. He transferred to Memphis State and majored in theater.

Career
In Memphis, Dye discovered that a Judd Nelson film called Making the Grade (1984) was filming in the area. Dye landed his first film role as "Skip." In the 1985 music video for the ZZ Top song "Sleeping Bag", he appeared alongside fellow actors Tracey Walter and Heather Langenkamp. In 1986 he starred alongside actresses Virginia Madsen and Cynthia Gibb in the comedy film Modern Girls. In 1987 Dye got his first leading role, in the film Campus Man, as Todd Barrett. That same year, he re-teamed with Nelson in the television miniseries Billionaire Boys Club. In 1989, he starred alongside actors James Earl Jones and Eric Roberts in the martial-arts drama Best of the Best.

Dye began appearing on television in 1987. He was cast in 1989 as Private Francis "Doc Hoc" Hockenbury for the last season of Tour of Duty. When the series finished, he moved on to short-lived series such as Jack's Place (1992) and Hotel Malibu (1994). In 1996, he appeared as Andrew the "Angel of Death" on Touched by an Angel with Roma Downey & Della Reese. Originally cast as a recurring character, by the third season, he was made a regular cast member as his character quickly became popular. The show ran for nine seasons before ending in April 2003. In 2000, he starred in the television movie Once Upon a Christmas and the following year, he appeared in the sequel Twice Upon a Christmas. Also in 2000, he starred in the documentary, Journey to a Hate Free Millennium.

Death
Dye was found dead in his home in San Francisco on January 10, 2011, at the age of 47. While the medical examiner initially indicated a cause of death had not been determined, the cause of death listed on Dye's May 2011-issued death certificate was "acute methamphetamine intoxication".

Filmography

References

External links
 
 

1963 births
2011 deaths
20th-century American male actors
20th-century Methodists
21st-century American male actors
Accidental deaths in California
American United Methodists
American male film actors
American male television actors
Burials in Mississippi
Drug-related deaths in California
Male actors from Mississippi
Male actors from Tennessee
People from Amory, Mississippi
People from Cleveland, Tennessee
People from Tupelo, Mississippi
Tupelo High School alumni
University of Memphis alumni